Vicente Enrique Almonacid Heyl (born 28 October 2000) is a Chilean Paralympic swimmer who competes in international swimming competitions. Almonacid is a Parapan American Games and World champion in the breaststroke, and was the first Chilean swimmer to win a World title. He competed at the 2020 Summer Paralympics, where he finished in eighth place in his final.

Personal life
Almonacid was born with an aggressive form of fibromatosis, a condition that causes developing tumours on the body. One of his fingers was surgically removed when he was five years old; he also had his left arm amputated and has had multiple operations since then. He began swimming as part of rehabilitation and was trained by Uruguayan former swimmer José Mafio, who participated at the 2004 Summer Olympics.

A month before the 2020 Summer Paralympics, Almonacid found a tumor on his mediastinum. He had the tumor removed despite the operation being complex and high risk due to the location where the tumor was discovered and his health condition.

References

2000 births
Living people
Paralympic swimmers of Chile
Chilean male breaststroke swimmers
Swimmers at the 2020 Summer Paralympics
Medalists at the World Para Swimming Championships
Medalists at the 2019 Parapan American Games
Place of birth missing (living people)
S8-classified Paralympic swimmers